Rakan Al-Khalidi (born 21 October 1988) is a Jordanian professional footballer who plays as a striker.

International career
Rakan's first international match with the Jordan national team that he played was against Palestine in Doha on 11 December 2011 in the 2011 Pan Arab Games when Jordan won 4-1.

International goals

International career statistics

Honors and Participation in International Tournaments

In Pan Arab Games 
2011 Pan Arab Games

In WAFF Championships 
2012 WAFF Championship

References

External links
 
 

1988 births
Living people
Jordanian footballers
Jordan international footballers
Association football forwards
Al-Ahli SC (Amman) players
Al-Ramtha SC players
Al-Jazeera (Jordan) players
Sahab SC players
Ma'an SC players
Mansheyat Bani Hasan players
Al-Salt SC players
Jordanian Pro League players
People from Mafraq